Laiguangying Area is an area and township on the northern part of Chaoyang District, Beijing, China. It borders Tiantong Yuannan, Tiantong Yuanbei Subdistricts and Beijia Town to the north, Sunhe and Cuigezhuang Townships to the east, Donghu and Datun Subdistricts to the south, Tiantong Yuannan and Aoyuncun Subdistricts to the west. In the year 2020, it has a total population of 163,970.

This area was historically a barrack for the Plain Blue Banner troops of Qing dynasty, and was known as Lanying (Blue Barrack), which was later corrupted to Laiying. Its first appearance on record as Laiguangying was in 1908.

History

Administrative Divisions 
At the end of 2021, there are a total of 34 subdivisions under Laiguangying, in which 29 are communities and 5 are villages:

See also 
 List of township-level divisions of Beijing

References

Chaoyang District, Beijing
Areas of Beijing